Sílvia Gonçalves Rodrigues Leite (Santos, March 10, 1929) is a former Brazilian television actress and presenter.

Music career 
Daughter of Spanish immigrants from A Gudiña, Galicia, Rodrigues had a certain contact with music since her childhood when her parents sung Spanish and Galician folk songs. 

Lolita Rodrigues is known for her musical career having released many studio albums during her trajectory. In 1977 she was selected by Rede Globo, the Brazilian national broadcaster to represent Brazil in the sixth edition of the OTI Festival, which was held in Madrid. Her entry was a bilingual song in Spanish and Portuguese languages entitled "Pedindo Amor" (Asking for love). Although she ended in the last place, tied with other four competing performers, both her music and acting career went on successfully.

Telenovelas
2009 - Viver a Vida .... as Noêmia
2006 - Pé na Jaca .... as Carmen
1999 / 2006 - Zorra Total (sitcom) .... as Ornela
2003 - Kubanacan .... as Dona Isabelita
2000 - Uga-Uga .... as Carmem
1999 - Terra Nostra .... as Dolores
1999 - Louca Paixão .... as Helena
1998 - Estrela de Fogo .... as Clara
1998 - Do Fundo do Coração .... as Alzira
1997 - Uma Janela para o Céu .... as Dona Dalva
1997 - Canoa do Bagre .... as Clarita
1996 - Razão de Viver .... as Carmem
1994 - A Viagem .... as Fátima
1992 - Despedida de Solteiro .... as Emília
1990 - A História de Ana Raio e Zé Trovão .... as Verônica
1990 - Rainha da Sucata .... as Lena
1987 - Sassaricando .... as Aldonza
1986 - Memórias de Um Gigolô (minissérie)
1978 - O Direito de Nascer .... as Dora
1972 - Quero Viver .... as Severina
1972 - O Tempo Não Apaga
1971 - Os Deuses Estão Mortos .... as Eleonora
1970 - As Pupilas do Senhor Reitor .... as Joana
1969 - Algemas de Ouro .... as Linda
1968 - A Última Testemunha .... as Constância
1966 - Anjo Marcado .... as Júlia
1965 - Em Busca da Felicidade .... as Anita
1965 - Os Quatro Filhos
1965 - Ontem, Hoje e Sempre .... as Laura
1964 - O Pintor e a Florista .... as Clélia
1964 - Ilsa
1964 - Ambição .... as Guida
1964 - Mãe .... as Maria
1963 - Aqueles que Dizem Amar-se .... as Mariana
1963 - 2-5499 Ocupado

References

External links

1929 births
Living people
People from Santos, São Paulo
Brazilian people of Spanish descent
Brazilian telenovela actresses